Knattspyrnufélag Reykjavíkur (Reykjavík Football Club), often shortened to KR or KR Reykjavík, is an Icelandic football club based in the Vesturbær district of the capital, Reykjavík.

KR is the oldest and most successful club in Icelandic football, having won the Besta deild karla championship 27 times, including the first season in 1912. It is also the most successful club in the Icelandic men's Cup, with 14 titles including the first in 1960 and most recent in 2014. In 1964, KR was also the first Icelandic representative in the European Cup.

History

Early history

KR was established on 16 February 1899, making it the oldest football club in Iceland. It was founded as Fótboltafélag Reykjavíkur (Reykjavík Football Club), before changing to Knattspyrnufélag Reykjavíkur, also meaning Reykjavík Football Club, the change due to "knattspyrna" being considered a more elegant word ("Fótbolti" is literally translated as "football" while "knattspyrna", while translating as "football", is literally "ballkicking"). KR was the only football club in Reykjavík for a decade, but as soon as other clubs were established there were plans for competitions. KR won the inaugural championship in 1912 after a play-off with Fram.

1955–1998
KR won the first title after the Icelandic league was divided into two divisions in 1955, and won again in 1959 when the 1st Division was played on a home-and-away basis for the first time. KR also won the first Icelandic Cup competition in 1960. KR was the first Icelandic club to play in European competition, entering the 1964–65 European Cup. They lost the preliminary round 11–1 on aggregate to Liverpool, who were also playing their first European tie. KR's women's team was also the first Icelandic contender in Europe, entering the inaugural European Competition in 2001.

KR won their 20th title in 1968. They were relegated for the first time to the Second Division in 1977, but narrowly missed winning the first division in 1990, 1996 and 1998, when KR lost out in the title race on the final day; all of which strengthened the solidarity within the club.

Recent history
In KR's centenary year in 1999 the team ended its long quest for another national title. The team had not won the league title for 31 years despite often being viewed as favourites but they looked favourites all season this time. They clinched the title with a 4–0 win over Víkingur in the penultimate round and then beat ÍA 3–1 in the cup final in front of a capacity crowd at the national stadium. The women's team was equally successful, winning the league and the cup, and KR celebrated its centenary year with an unprecedented double-double.

In total, the men's team has won the league title 26 times and the cup 14 times and during the last decade the women's team has won six league titles and twice won the cup. The men's team has four times won the double, in 1961, 1963, 1999 and in 2011.

KR's best European success was in 2009–10 UEFA Europa League when they defeated AE Larissa (2–0, 1–1) in the  second qualifying round, but were eliminated in next round by Basel (2–2, 1–3). In 2011–12 UEFA Europa League, KR eliminated ÍF Fuglafjørður in the first qualifying round and achieved a big win against MŠK Žilina in the next round (3–0) in Reykjavík and though losing 2–0 in Zilina advanced through to the next round where they lost to Dinamo Tbilisi (1–6 on aggregate).

Jersey

KR play in black and white stripes.  This is in tribute to the English club Newcastle United who were the current English champions when KR were formed. The current sponsor of KR is the Icelandic medical company Alvogen. Above the club badge on the shirt, although not featured on replica shirts, there are five stars, each representing 5 of KR's 25 league titles.  On 20 October 2006, KR introduced a new deal with sport equipment manufacturer Nike and the team will wear products from Nike for the 2007 season.

The KR shorts are black and white and only carry the logo of Eimskip, Nike the KR badge and the squad number of the player. The KR socks are black and white and are without a club badge.

Other sports

Besides football, which is the original sport for which the club was founded, KR today also practices basketball, badminton, table tennis, bowling, darts, team handball, skiing, Icelandic wrestling and swimming.

Grounds
KR have been playing at their own ground, KR-völlur (KR Field) in the west end of Reykjavík, since 1984, having previously played at the national stadium (Laugardalsvöllur) and at the old municipal stadium (Melavöllur). KR has had the highest attendances for the last nine years. Only 376 attended the first match at KR-völlur in 1984 but in the centenary year an average crowd of 2,501 saw KR's home matches: about 0.75% of the Icelandic population.

Players

Current squad

European cups history

As of 13 July 2017

Overall

Matches

Club honours
Icelandic Championships: (27)
1912, 1919, 1926, 1927, 1928, 1929, 1931, 1932, 1934, 1941, 1948, 1949, 1950, 1952, 1955, 1959, 1961, 1963, 1965, 1968, 1999, 2000, 2002, 2003, 2011, 2013, 2019
Runners-up: (24) 1916, 1917, 1920, 1923, 1930, 1933, 1935, 1936, 1937, 1943, 1944, 1945, 1954, 1956, 1958, 1960, 1983, 1990, 1992, 1995, 1996, 1998, 2006, 2009
Icelandic Cups: (14)
1960, 1961, 1962, 1963, 1964, 1966, 1967, 1994, 1995, 1999, 2008, 2011, 2012, 2014
Icelandic League Cups: (8)
1998, 2001, 2005, 2010, 2012, 2016, 2017, 2019
Icelandic Super Cup: (6)
1969, 1996, 2003, 2012, 2014, 2020

Managers
 Óli B. Jónsson (1945), (1947–51), (1954–55), (1958– 31 December 1961), (1 January 1969–70)
 Ellert Schram 1973
 Gordon Lee (1985–87)
 Guðjón Þórðarson (1 July 1994 – 30 June 1995)
 Atli Eðvaldsson (1 July 1998–99)
 Pétur Pétursson (2000–01)
 David Winnie 2001
 Willum Þór Þórsson 2002 – 2004
 Magnús Gylfason 2005
 Teitur Þórðarson (2006 – 11 December 2007)
 Logi Ólafsson (1 July 2007 – 20 July 2010)
 Rúnar Kristinsson (20 July 2010 – 10 October 2014)
 Bjarni Gudjonsson (15 October 2014 – 26 June 2016)
 Rúnar Kristinsson (2017– )

References

External links
 Official website
 Fansite

 
Multi-sport clubs in Iceland
Association football clubs established in 1899
Football clubs in Iceland
Football clubs in Reykjavík
1899 establishments in Iceland